Abby Rakic-Platt (born 3 May 1993) is a British actress best known for her performances in the television series The Story of Tracy Beaker on the children's channel CBBC as Jackie Hopper. She appeared in a 2010 Sainsbury's Christmas advert.

Early and personal life
She attended Highams Park School and Grey Coat Hospital secondary school, both in London, England, and has four younger siblings, Madeline "Maddie", Jaime and Eloise Rakic-Platt (born in 2001) who are also actresses. Rakic-Platt's maternal grandfather is from Yugoslavia. Rakic-Platt was trained at the Anna Scher Theatre School, attending from the age of 7 or 8 to 18. Rakic-Platt lives in Walthamstow with her father, a taxi driver, and her mother, a school secretary.

Her sister Madeline appeared in programmes such as the last episode of The Story of Tracy Beaker, and the eldest daughter of Peter Capaldi's character in Torchwood: Children of Earth; whilst her youngest sister Eloise appeared in the Doctor Who episode Forest of the Dead.

Filmography

Theatre

References

External links

1993 births
Living people
English television actresses
English soap opera actresses
English child actresses
British child actresses
21st-century English actresses
British people of Yugoslav descent
English stage actresses